Omar Ciss (born 4 August 2001) is a Senegalese footballer who currently plays for Charlotte Independence in the USL League One.

Career

Montverde Academy
Ciss was part of the Florida-based Montverde Academy.

Austin Bold 
On 21 April 2020, Ciss signed for USL Championship team Austin Bold. He made his debut on 17 July 2020, starting in a 3-1 loss to OKC Energy.

Charlotte Independence 
On 5 April 2022, Ciss joined Charlotte Independence in the USL League One, signing a one year contract.

References

External links 
 Omar Ciss | uslchampionship.com USL Championship bio

2001 births
Living people
Senegalese footballers
Senegalese expatriate footballers
Senegalese expatriates in the United States
Association football midfielders
Expatriate soccer players in the United States
Montverde Academy alumni
Austin Bold FC players
USL Championship players
Footballers from Dakar
Charlotte Independence players
USL League One players